Xiàndài (现代) is a term meaning modern or Modern Era in Mandarin Chinese. It is often used in one of the following contexts: 

Xiàndài Hànyǔ Chángyòng Zìbiǎo (现代汉语常用字表), "List of Frequently Used Characters in Modern Chinese" published by the People's Republic of China
Xiandai wenxue (現代文學), "Modern Literature", Taiwan-based literary journal.

See also
Modern (disambiguation)